Boulder Basin is the westernmost of the three basins occupied by the Lake Mead reservoir and lies within the boundaries of Clark County, Nevada and Mohave County, Arizona. It includes the area between Hoover Dam and the mouth of Boulder Canyon at Auxiliary Point. It includes Las Vegas Bay, Swallow Bay, Callville Bay and Hamblin Bay.

References

Boulder Basin
Boulder Basin
Bodies of water of Mohave County, Arizona